The 2012 Copa Federación was the 1st Peruvian football championship contested by the winners of Primera División and the Copa Inca. The match was originally scheduled to take place on August 1, 2012 but was postponed by the Peruvian Federation due to overscheduling. The match took place on September 9, 2012.

Qualified teams

Match details

References

External links
Peruvian Football League News 

Football competitions in Peru
2012 in Peruvian football
José Gálvez FBC matches
Juan Aurich matches